Paul Michael Romer (born November 6, 1955) is an American economist and policy entrepreneur who is a University Professor in Economics at New York University. Romer is best known as the former Chief Economist of the World Bank and for co-receiving the 2018 Nobel Memorial Prize in Economic Sciences (shared with William Nordhaus) for his work in endogenous growth theory. He also coined the term "mathiness," which he describes as misuse of mathematics in economic research.

Before joining NYU, Romer was a professor at the University of Chicago, the University of California, Berkeley, Stanford University's Graduate School of Business, and the University of Rochester. Romer was chief economist and senior vice president of the World Bank until he resigned in January 2018 following a controversy arising from his claim of possible political manipulation of Chile's "ease of doing business" ranking. Romer took leave from his position as professor of economics at NYU when he joined the World Bank, and returned to NYU after his term. In addition, he has also been a researcher at the National Bureau of Economic Research, Stanford's Center for International Development, the Stanford Institute for Economic Policy Research, the Hoover Institution, as well as a fellow at the American Academy of Arts and Sciences and the Center for Global Development.

Early life and education
Romer was born to former Colorado governor Roy Romer and Beatrice "Bea" Miller. He has four brothers and two sisters. One of his brothers, Chris Romer, is a former Colorado state senator.

He graduated in 1973 from Phillips Exeter Academy. He earned his Bachelor of Science in mathematics and a PhD in economics in 1983, both from the University of Chicago, after graduate studies at Massachusetts Institute of Technology from 1977 to 1979 and at Queen's University (Kingston, Canada) from 1979 to 1980.

Career
Romer's most important work is in the field of economic growth, and he has made important contributions in the development of endogenous growth theory. He was named one of America's 25 most influential people by Time magazine in 1997, and he was awarded the Horst Claus Recktenwald Prize in Economics in 2002. In 2015, he was recipient of the John R. Commons Award, given by the economics honor society Omicron Delta Epsilon.

Academia
Romer's research on economic growth followed extensive studies of long-run growth during the 1950s and 1960s. The Solow–Swan model, for example, established the primacy of technological progress in accounting for sustained increases in output per worker. His 1983 dissertation, supervised by José Scheinkman and Robert Lucas Jr., amounted to constructing mathematical representations of economies in which technological change is the result of the intentional actions of people, such as research and development. It led to two Journal of Political Economy articles published in 1986 and 1990, respectively, which started endogenous growth theory. 

He taught at the University of Rochester, the University of Chicago, the University of California, Berkeley, Stanford University and New York University. At New York University, he founded the Marron Institute of Urban Management. Its objective is to assist cities in planning its future developments, specifically improving the safety, health, and mobility of citizens.

Business
Romer temporarily left academia in 2001 to found Aplia, a company which produces online problem sets for college students. Students have submitted upwards of 2.4 billion answers to homework problems on the Aplia website. Aplia was purchased in 2007 by Cengage Learning.

He is credited with the quote "A crisis is a terrible thing to waste," which he said during a November 2004 venture-capitalist meeting in California. Although he was referring to the rapidly rising education levels in other countries compared to the United States, the quote became a rallying concept for economists and consultants looking for constructive opportunities amid the Great Recession.

Charter cities
Romer has attempted to replicate the success of charter cities and make them an engine of economic growth in developing countries. He promoted this idea in a TED talk in 2009, and he has argued that with better rules and institutions less developed nations can be set on a different and better trajectory for growth. In his model, a host country would turn responsibility for a charter city over to a more developed trustee nation, which would allow for new rules of governance to emerge. People could "vote with their feet" for or against these rules.

The government of Honduras considered creating charter cities, though without the oversight of a third-party government, which some argue is neo-colonialism. Romer served as chair of a "transparency committee" but resigned in September 2012 when the Honduran government agency responsible for the project signed agreements with international developers without involvement of the committee.

World Bank
He became World Bank Chief Economist in October 2016. He resigned on 24 January 2018, following a controversy in which he stated in an interview with The Wall Street Journal on January 12,  that during the tenure of Chile's socialist President Michelle Bachelet from 2014 onwards, Chile's ranking for ease of doing business had been downgraded by the World Bank as a result of changes of methodology which he claimed may have been politically motivated, a claim denied by the former World Bank economist responsible for compiling Chile's ranking, Chilean economist Augusto Lopez-Claros.

Nobel Memorial Prize in Economics

Romer shared the 2018 Prize with William Nordhaus. In choosing Romer as one of the 2018 economics laureates, the Royal Swedish Academy of Sciences stated that he had shown "how knowledge can function as a driver of long-term economic growth. . . . [Prior macroeconomic studies]  had not modelled how economic decisions and market conditions determine the creation of new technologies. Paul Romer solved this problem by demonstrating how economic forces govern the willingness of firms to produce new ideas and innovations."

After receiving the prize, Romer described how he started thinking about the relationship between growth and innovation:
"The question that I first asked was, why was progress . . . speeding up over time? It arises because of this special characteristic of an idea, which is if [a million people try] to discover something, if any one person finds it, everybody can use the idea."

The same day he received the award, Romer married Caroline Weber, a professor of French Literature at Barnard College.

Publications
 "Growth Cycles", with George Evans and Seppo Honkapohja (American Economic Review, June 1998). 
 "Preferences, Promises, and the Politics of Entitlement" (Individual and Social Responsibility: Child Care, Education, Medical Care, and Long-Term Care in America, Victor R. Fuchs (ed.), Chicago: University of Chicago Press, 1995).
 "New Goods, Old Theory, and the Welfare Costs of Trade Restrictions," Journal of Development Economics, No. 43 (1994), pp. 5–38.
 "Looting: The Economic Underworld of Bankruptcy for Profit" with George Akerlof (Brookings Papers on Economic Activity 2, William C. Brainard and George L. Perry (eds.), 1993, pp. 1–74). 
 "Economic Integration and Endogenous Growth," with Luis Rivera-Batiz (Quarterly Journal of Economics CVI, May 1991, pp. 531–55). 
 "Endogenous Technological Change" (Journal of Political Economy, October 1990). 
 "Increasing Returns and Long Run Growth" (Journal of Political Economy, October 1986). 
 "Cake Eating, Chattering and Jumps: Existence Results for Variational Problems" (Econometrica 54, July 1986, pp. 897–908).

See also
 Endogenous growth theory
 Good governance
 Special economic zone
 Mathiness

References

External links

Paul Romer's web site
 including his Prize Lecture 8 December 2018 On the Possibility of Progress

1955 births
20th-century American economists
21st-century American economists
American chief executives of education-related organizations
American computer businesspeople
American Nobel laureates
American officials of the United Nations
American technology chief executives
American technology company founders
Center for Global Development
Businesspeople from Denver
Economists from Colorado
Fellows of the American Academy of Arts and Sciences
Fellows of the Econometric Society
Growth economists
Living people
New York University Stern School of Business faculty
Nobel laureates in Economics
Phillips Exeter Academy alumni
Stanford University faculty
University of California, Berkeley faculty
University of Chicago alumni
World Bank Chief Economists